Inquisitor sexradiata is a species of sea snail, a marine gastropod mollusk in the family Pseudomelatomidae.

Description

Distribution
This marine species is endemic to Australia and occurs off Western Australia.

References

 Odhner, N.H. 1917. Results of Dr E. Mjöbergs Swedish scientific expeditions to Australia. 1910-1913, pt XVII, Mollusca. Kongliga Svenska Vetenskaps-Academiens Nya Handlingar, Stockholm 52(16): 1-115 pls 1-3 
  Hedley, C. 1922. A revision of the Australian Turridae. Records of the Australian Museum 13(6): 213–359, pls 42-56

External links
  Tucker, J.K. 2004 Catalog of recent and fossil turrids (Mollusca: Gastropoda). Zootaxa 682:1–1295

sexradiata
Gastropods of Australia
Gastropods described in 1917